John Dickson (June 1, 1783 – February 22, 1852) was a U.S. Representative from New York.

Early years
Born in Keene, New Hampshire, Dickson graduated from Middlebury College of Vermont in 1808. He studied law and was admitted to the bar in 1812 and commenced practice in West Bloomfield, New York.

Career
He served as member of the State assembly in 1829 and 1830.

Dickson was elected as an Anti-Masonic candidate to the Twenty-second and Twenty-third Congresses (March 4, 1831 – March 3, 1835). He served as chairman of the Committee on Revisal and Unfinished Business (Twenty-third Congress).

Personal life
He resumed the practice of law in West Bloomfield, New York, where he died on February 22, 1852. He was interred in Pioneer Cemetery. His home at West Bloomfield, known as the John and Mary Dickson House, was listed on the National Register of Historic Places in 2005.

References

1783 births
1852 deaths
People from Keene, New Hampshire
Anti-Masonic Party members of the United States House of Representatives from New York (state)
People from West Bloomfield, New York
Middlebury College alumni
19th-century American politicians